San Martín is a town and municipality in the Meta Department, Colombia.

References

Municipalities of Meta Department